Timerlan Huseinov Club is a non-official list of Ukrainian football players that have scored 100 or more goals during their professional career in top Ukrainian league, cup, European cups and national team. This club is named after first Ukrainian player to score 100 goals - Timerlan Huseinov.

Which goals are counted 

Traditionally, counted goals scored in the following matches:

 Championship - goals scored in top leagues of Ukrainian football competitions.
 Cup - goals in Ukrainian Cup and Supercup scored in the stages where top league teams participate.
 European cups - goals scored in European Champion Clubs Cup, UEFA Champions League, UEFA Cup, Cup Winners Cup, and Intertoto Cup for both home and foreign clubs.
 National team - goals scored for national and olympic teams in the official matches.

Timerlan Huseinov Club  
As of November 23, 2015:

Players still playing are shown in bold.

References 

  All-time Vyscha Liha scorers

See also
Serhiy Rebrov club

Ukrainian football trophies and awards
Lists of association football players